Refund Sisters is a seasonal South Korean supergroup formed on the MBC variety show Hangout with Yoo. The group is a spin-off of SSAK3 – another group formed on Hangout with Yoo. They made their debut with the single "Don't Touch Me" on October 10, 2020.

History
In June 2020, Lee Hyori joked about forming the ideal girl crush girl group with herself, Jessi, Uhm Jung-hwa, and MAMAMOO's Hwasa. In a later episode, she shared the idea of having Yoo Jae-suk, the main entertainer on Hangout with Yoo, as the group's manager. After the episode's broadcast, all three mentioned singers responded positively to Hyori's idea and were willing to participate in the project. The concept also received positive support from the public.

In August 2020, the Refund Sisters project was initiated right after the end of the SSAK3 project, bringing the four singers together to form a girl group. Auditions for the group's manager role was carried out, with Kim Jong-min and Jung Jae-hyung chosen for the role. Like the SSAK3 project, all proceeds from Refund Sisters' promotions will be donated to charities.

The group released their debut single "Don't Touch Me" on October 10. The official MV for "Don't Touch Me" was released on October 28.

Members
Uhm Jung-hwa (Man Ok)
Lee Hyori (Cheon Ok)
Jessi (Eun Bi)
Hwasa (Sil Bi)

Producer
Yoo Jae-suk (Jimi Yoo)

Managers
Kim Jong-min (Kim Ji-sub)
Jung Jae-hyung (Jung Bong-won)

Discography

Singles

References

2020 establishments in South Korea
K-pop music groups
Musical groups established in 2020
Musical groups from Seoul
South Korean pop music groups
Musical quartets